The Ambassador of Australia to Denmark is an officer of the Australian Department of Foreign Affairs and Trade and the head of the Embassy of the Commonwealth of Australia in Denmark. The Ambassador, since August 2021, is Kerin Ayyalaraju, who resides in Copenhagen. The ambassador also holds non-resident accreditation for Iceland (1984–1997; since 2000) and Norway (since 2000). Accreditation was also previously held for  Latvia and Lithuania following their regaining independence (1991–1997). The embassy was first opened in November 1970, when the existing Consulate-General in Copenhagen was upgraded, and the embassy remained until it was closed in May 1997 due to "budgetary pressures". While accreditation passed to the Australian Embassy in Sweden in the period after that, the embassy was reopened May 2000.

List of heads of mission

Notes
 Also non-resident Ambassador to the Republic of Iceland, 1984–1997; since 2000.
 Also non-resident Ambassador to the Republic of Latvia, 1991–1997.
 Also non-resident Ambassador to the Republic of Lithuania, 1991–1997.
 Also non-resident Ambassador to the Kingdom of Norway, since 2000.

References

External links
Australian Embassy, Denmark – Norway, Iceland

 
 
Denmark
Australia